The 1976 Cork Senior Hurling Championship was the 88th staging of the Cork Senior Hurling Championship since its establishment by the Cork County Board in 1887. The championship began on 25 April 1976 and ended on 3 October 1976.

Blackrock entered the championship as the defending champions.

The final was played on 3 October 1976 at the newly-opened Páirc Uí Chaoimh in Cork, between Glen Rovers and Blackrock, in what was their second consecutive meeting in the final. Glen Rovers won the match by 2-07 to 0-10 to claim their 24th championship title overall and a first title in four years.

Tom Collins was the championship's top scorer with 5-08.

Team changes

To Championship

Promoted from the Cork Intermediate Hurling Championship
 Ballinhassig

From Championship

Regraded to the Cork Intermediate Hurling Championship
 St. Vincent's

Results

First round

Second round

Quarter-finals

Semi-finals

Final

Championship statistics

Top scorers

Overall

In a single game

Miscellaneous

 On 20 August 1976, Glen Rovers defeated Seandún in the first senior championship game to take place at Páirc Uí Chaoimh.
 The final is played in Páirc Uí Chaoimh for the first time.

References

Cork Senior Hurling Championship
Cork Senior Hurling Championship